Cophomantella is a genus of moths in the family Lecithoceridae described by Thomas Bainbrigge Fletcher in 1940. The name of this genus is a replacement name for Cophomantis Meyrick.

Species
Cophomantella alphanozoma (Meyrick, 1926) (Sierra Leone and Uganda)
Cophomantella artonoma (Meyrick, 1936) (from Congo)
Cophomantella bifrenata (Meyrick, 1921) (South Africa and Tanzania)
Cophomantella bythota (Meyrick, 1916) (Ghana)
Cophomantella crypsizyga (Meyrick, 1914) (from Malawi)
Cophomantella cubiculata (Meyrick, 1911) (Seychelles)
Cophomantella cyclopodes (Meyrick, 1922) (from Tanzania)
Cophomantella elaphopis (Meyrick, 1910) (India)
Cophomantella eremota (Meyrick, 1911) (Sri Lanka)
Cophomantella furnaria (Meyrick, 1913) (from South Africa)
Cophomantella homogramma (Meyrick, 1918) (from South Africa)
Cophomantella lychnocentra (Meyrick, 1904) (Tasmania)
Cophomantella myadelpha (Meyrick, 1910) (India)
Cophomantella osphrantica (Meyrick, 1929) (India)
Cophomantella pumicata (Meyrick, 1929) (India)
Cophomantella syngonarcha (Meyrick, 1926) (from Uganda)

References

 
Lecithoceridae